Jand is a Tehsil of Attock District in the Punjab province of Pakistan. The town is the headquarters of Jand, an administrative subdivision, of the district. It lies to the south of the district capital Attock.

Jand is located on the western bank of the Indus River, and is known for its fertile agricultural land,with more than 700,00+ population.

References

Cities and towns in Attock District